Scelidocteus is a genus of African palp-footed spiders that was first described by Eugène Louis Simon in 1907.

Species
 it contains seven species, found only in Africa:
Scelidocteus baccatus Simon, 1907 – São Tomé and Príncipe
Scelidocteus berlandi Lessert, 1930 – Congo
Scelidocteus lamottei Jézéquel, 1964 – Ivory Coast
Scelidocteus ochreatus Simon, 1907 – Guinea-Bissau
Scelidocteus pachypus Simon, 1907 (type) – West Africa
Scelidocteus schoutedeni Benoit, 1974 – Congo
Scelidocteus vuattouxi Jézéquel, 1964 – Ivory Coast

See also
 List of Palpimanidae species

References

Araneomorphae genera
Palpimanidae
Spiders of Africa